Sarah Maclardie Amos born Sarah Maclardie Bunting (1840–1908) was a political activist. She was the superintendent of the Working Women's College in Queen Square, London.

Life
Amos was born in Manchester in 1840 to Eliza and Thomas Percival Bunting. She had three siblings, Mary, Eliza and Percy who went onto edit the Contemporary Review. In 1865 she became the superintendent of the Working Women's College in Queen Square. The college had been founded to deliver education to working women by Elizabeth Malleson in 1864.

Amos married Sheldon Amos in 1870. He was a Law professor at University College London and despite their income they decided to live in the poorer area near Red Lion Square. Their daughter Bonté was born in 1870 and her son was Maurice Amos was born in 1872 and they moved to New Barnet.

Sarah and Amos took a prominent part in Liberal Nonconformist politics and in movements connected with the position of women. They opposed laws that further criminalized prostitutes and they campaigned against the Contagious Diseases Act.

The Amos family moved to Australia in 1880 in an attempt to fix his father's health problems. However they did not like the country and stopped in Egypt with the ambition of returning to England. Sheldon was offered and accepted work helping Lord Dufferin with legal issues. All three of them stayed in Egypt until Sheldon's died in 1886.

The first meeting of the "Society for Promoting the Return of Women as County Councillors" in November 1888 at her house. This what would become the Women's Local Government Society and the invitees included several of her relatives. The group was led by Annie Leigh Browne and it was deciding suitable women candidates for election. Sarah died in Cairo on 21 January 1908 whilst staying with her son.

References 

1840 births
1908 deaths
English activists
English women activists